On 18 February 2018, a 22-year-old man local to the Russia’s southern republic of Dagestan carrying a knife and a double-barreled shotgun opened fire on a crowd at an Orthodox church in Kizlyar, killing five women and injuring several other people, including two police and three others. He was shot and killed by police on duty nearby.

The attack occurred as churchgoers celebrated the Sunday of Forgiveness, the last day of Cheesefare week, a Christian holiday marking the last day before Lent according to the eastern Orthodox calendar.

The Islamic State of Iraq and the Levant (ISIL) named the man Khalil al-Dagestani, one of its soldiers. Police named him Khalil Khalilov. Pro-ISIL social media later shared a video of a masked man with a shotgun and knife, said to be the killer, pledging his allegiance to Abu Bakr al-Baghdadi.

References

2018 mass shootings in Europe
21st-century mass murder in Russia
Attacks on churches in Europe
February 2018 crimes in Europe
February 2018 events in Russia
History of Dagestan
ISIL terrorist incidents
Islamic terrorist incidents in 2018
Islamist attacks on churches
Mass murder in 2018
Mass shootings in Russia
Islamic terrorism in Russia
Terrorist incidents in Russia in 2018
Attacks on buildings and structures in Russia
Islam in the Caucasus